Disinterest is the first album by British indie band The Servants. The record was released in 1990 on Paperhouse Records.

Context
Luke Haines describes Disinterest as "art rock, ten years too late and fifteen years too early".

Tim Peacock at Record Collector magazine said of Disinterest in 2013 that: "while it's recently been dusted down for critical reappraisal, it remains out of print." Matthew Fiander at PopMatters called it "a great record.... Angular and bittersweet."

Mojo magazine included Disinterest in its December 2011 list of the greatest British indie records of all time.

The Servants' second album, Small Time, was recorded in 1991 but had to wait twenty-one years for its 2012 release on Cherry Red Records.

Release history
Paperhouse Records issued Disinterest in LP and CD formats in July 1990. The record is not available. Its long unavailability is explained in the notes to 2012's Small Time album: Disinterest is "stuck in an irretrievable record company quagmire, where it looks set to remain."

Paperhouse released the track "Look Like a Girl" as a 7" single in August 1990.

Track listing

Side one
Move Out (3:40)
The Power of Woman (3:25)
Restless (3:47)
Third Wheel (3:06)
Thin-Skinned (2:42)
Self-Destruction (2:45)

Side two
Hush Now (5:40)
They Should Make a Statue (2:58)
Hey, Mrs John (2:55)
Look Like a Girl (4:07)
Big Future (2:51)
Afterglow (4:44)

Personnel
David Westlake – vocals and guitar
Luke Haines – vocals, guitar and piano
Alice Readman – bass
Andy Bennett – drums

References

1990 debut albums
The Servants albums